White bread typically refers to breads made from wheat flour from which the bran and the germ layers have been removed from the whole wheatberry as part of the flour grinding or milling process, producing a light-colored flour. This milling process can give white flour a longer shelf life by removing the natural oils from the whole grain. Removing the oil allows products made with the flour, like white bread, to be stored for longer periods of time avoiding potential rancidity.

The flour used in white breads is often bleached further—by the use of flour bleaching agents such as potassium bromate, azodicarbonamide, or chlorine dioxide gas to remove any slight natural yellow shade and make its baking properties more predictable. This is banned in the EU. Some chemicals are also banned from use in other countries.

In the United States, consumers sometimes refer to white bread as "sandwich bread" or "sandwich loaf". It is often perceived as an unhealthy, bland, and unsophisticated menu item.

White bread contains ½ of the magnesium found in whole-wheat bread, and it is generally considered to be less nutritionally dense.

History

Bread made with grass grains goes back to the pre-agriculture Natufi proto-civilization 12,000 years ago. But only wheat can feasibly be sifted to produce pure white starch, a technique that goes back to at least ancient Egypt. Because wheat was the most expensive grain to grow, and the process to sift it labor-intensive, white flour was generally limited to special occasions and the wealthy, until the mid-19th century. Then industrial processes eliminated the labor cost, allowing prices to fall until it was accessible to the middle class.

In the US, corn meal was the standard grain for bread until closing in on the 20th century, while in Europe it was other grains.

But once accessible, white bread became very popular in industrialized countries for a number of reasons:

 That it was traditionally for the wealthy made white wheat bread seem desirable. 
 It also was easier to see as pure and clean, at a time when some foods could be poorly made and adulterated. 
 And the lack of both coarseness and complex flavor profile made it a popular medium for the delivery of flavorful condiments. 
 It is more easily chewed and digested. This allows it to be a source of more calories. It also does make some micronutrients more digestible, some studies finding that the added nutrition in whole grains tends to pass through the body unabsorbed. For some body types and diets, white flour may have been a nutritional benefit.
 Once it could be easily produced, it went from the most expensive to among the cheapest kinds of flour.
 It can last longer. The wheat oil in whole grain breads can go rancid over time, spoiling its flavor.

However, there was a backlash from the popularity of white flour, giving  rise to whole grain alternatives popular to this day, such as graham crackers and corn flakes, which (in their original whole grain form) have more fiber and micronutrients. Eventually, the transformation of white bread from an elite to a common foodstuff became symbolic of the success of industrialization and capitalism in general, especially paired with the advent of machine sliced bread in the 1920s. 

White bread has remained the most popular type of bread in the US and much of the industrialized world, despite a generational cycle of backlash against it.

White bread fortification
While a bran- and wheatgerm-discarding milling process can help improve white flour's shelf life, it does remove nutrients like some dietary fiber, iron, B vitamins, micronutrients and essential fatty acids. The US government has mandated since 1941 fortification of white flour-based foods with some of the nutrients lost in milling, like thiamin, riboflavin, niacin, and iron. This mandate came about in response to the vast nutrient deficiencies seen in US military recruits at the start of World War II. This fortification led to nearly universal eradication of deficiency diseases in the US, such as pellagra and beriberi (deficiencies of niacin and thiamine, respectively) and white bread continues to contain these added vitamins to this day.

Folic acid is another nutrient that some governments have mandated is added to enriched grains like white bread. In the US and Canada, these grains have been fortified with mandatory levels of folic acid since 1998 because of its important role in preventing birth defects. Since fortification began, the rate of neural tube defects has decreased by approximately one-third in the US. Folic acid supplementation was mandated in the UK in September 2021, joining more than 80 countries in the world with this public health measure.

See also

Brown bread, a bread that was considered undesirable in early-19th-century Europe
Chorleywood bread process, another common process for mass-produced bread
Flour treatment agent
Graham bread, an early reintroduction of an unbleached bread
Maida flour, a bleached flour typically used to make a white bread in India
Plain loaf
Pullman loaf, bread baked in a lidded pan, responsible for square-shaped slices
Rye bread, a bread that can be darker or neutral in color
Sliced bread, pre-sliced and packaged bread, first sold in 1928
Vienna bread, baking processes that lead to lighter, less sour breads
Whole wheat bread, one common alternative to white bread

References

External links 

 "white bread unenriched" search results at FoodData Central
 Bread, white wheat
 Bread, white

Wheat breads